Pinnacle Peak is a 6,562 ft (2,000 m) peak located in Mount Rainier National Park in Lewis County, Washington. It is the second highest peak in the Tatoosh Range.

The trail to the saddle and summit has views of Rainier. Some scrambling and rock climbing is needed to attain the summit.

Climate
Pinnacle Peak is located in the marine west coast climate zone of western North America. Most weather fronts originate in the Pacific Ocean, and travel northeast toward the Cascade Mountains. As fronts approach, they are forced upward by the peaks of the Cascade Range (orographic lift), causing them to drop their moisture in the form of rain or snowfall onto the Cascades. As a result, the west side of the Cascades experiences high precipitation, especially during the winter months in the form of snowfall. During winter months, weather is usually cloudy, but, due to high pressure systems over the Pacific Ocean that intensify during summer months, there is often little or no cloud cover during the summer. Because of maritime influence, snow tends to be wet and heavy.

References

External links
 National Park Service web site: Mount Rainier National Park

Gallery

Mountains of Lewis County, Washington
Mountains of Washington (state)
Mount Rainier National Park